The 2017–18 Appalachian State Mountaineers men's basketball team represented Appalachian State University during the 2017–18 NCAA Division I men's basketball season. The Mountaineers, led by fourth-year head coach Jim Fox, played their home games at the George M. Holmes Convocation Center in Boone, North Carolina as members of the Sun Belt Conference. They finished the season 15–18, 9–9 in Sun Belt play to finish in a three-way tie for fifth place. They defeated Little Rock in the first round of the Sun Belt tournament before losing in the quarterfinals to Texas–Arlington.

Previous season
The Mountaineers finished the 2016–17 season 9–21, 4–14 in Sun Belt play to finish in 11th place. They lost in the first round of the Sun Belt tournament to Troy.

Roster

Schedule and results

|-
!colspan=9 style=| Exhibition

|-
!colspan=9 style=| Non-conference regular season

|-
!colspan=9 style=| Sun Belt Conference regular season

|-
!colspan=9 style=| Sun Belt tournament

Source

References

Appalachian State Mountaineers men's basketball seasons
Appalachian State
Appalachian State
Appalachian State